is a Japanese manga series written and illustrated by Rumiko Takahashi. It was serialized in Shogakukan's shōnen manga magazine Weekly Shōnen Sunday from April 2009 to December 2017, with its chapters were collected into forty tankōbon volumes. The series follows Sakura Mamiya, a girl who gained the power to see ghosts after an incident as a child, and her classmate Rinne Rokudo, a boy of mixed human and shinigami heritage who helps lingering spirits finally pass on to be reincarnated.

The manga has been licensed in North America by Viz Media, which simultaneously released the manga chapters online in English as they were serialized in Japan until March 2011, and in Australasia by Madman Entertainment. A three season anime television series adaptation, produced by Brain's Base, aired in Japan from 2015 to 2017. As of August 2014, the manga had 3 million collected volumes in print.

Plot
Sakura Mamiya is a high school girl who became able to see ghosts after she was spirited away for a week when she was a child, though she does not remember the details of the experience. Once in high school, Sakura wishes to be rid of her extrasensory perception, which is an annoyance to her as no one else apart from her can see spirits. She meets a shinigami of sorts named Rinne Rōkudo, a classmate of hers who is absent for the first month or so of school. As a shinigami, his job to guide spirits, whose regrets bind them to Earth, to the wheel of reincarnation, a large, red spoked wheel revolving in the sky, so that they may be reborn, involves these two on dangerous and comedy-filled adventures.

Characters

Protagonists

 (commercial), Kaito Ishikawa (anime)
Rinne Rokudo is the main character of the story, a red-haired first-year high school boy of mixed human and shinigami heritage. He used to live with his grandparents until his human grandfather died, moving to reside in the human world instead despite his grandmother Tamako's protests. Due to his father Sabato's criminal activities, Rinne had his money stolen by him and out of poverty, lives in an abandoned club building of the school he attends. He performs the duties of a shinigami, but due to his human blood often requires extra tools to aid him, which are often quite expensive. The only costly shinigami item he owns is the famed , a robe that allows Rinne to not be seen by ordinary living beings and, when worn by a ghost inside out, turns a ghost into a solid being. Rinne's name is taken from "Rinne", the cycle of resurrection present in Buddhism, and Rokudo, the six paths that comprise it.
Upon meeting Sakura, she becomes his first human friend and develops strong feelings for her as the story progresses. The story eventually becomes more focused on Rinne in the later parts of the story, whereas Sakura takes on a more passive role. He is often protective of her, and places her best interests above his own. Rinne dislikes Tsubasa due to his violent ways of exorcising ghosts and competition for Sakura's affection with him, is also often annoyed with Ageha as she constantly tries to win his affection using various methods of trickery and manipulation, and especially hates his father whose greed and dishonesty goes against everything Rinne believes in. He resembles Sabato greatly apart from a slight difference in hair colour.

 (commercial), Marina Inoue (anime)
Sakura Mamiya is the narrator and heroine of the story, a first-year high school student characterized by her signature twin braids. Unlike normal humans, she has extrasensory perception, which was caused from a time where she was spirited away to the ghost world as a little girl, although she came back with the help of a Shinigami named Tamako. She is known for being very calm, quiet, and not expressive of her emotions. As the story progresses, it is hinted that Sakura develops feelings for Rinne, but doesn't show it. Even though she is usually calm and collected, Sakura does have a jealous side that rarely makes an appearance. She is completely unaware of Tsubasa and Rinne's affections towards her and just focuses on helping when she can or doing what is right. Her mother is a homemaker and her father works at a bank.

 (commercial), Hitomi Nabatame (anime)
Rokumon is a black cat by contract. These cats form contracts with shinigami, aiding them in their job, eliminating evil spirits, but also bringing curses, threats, and ill omens. His appearance is that of a little black cat with a human face, changing into a demonic giant cat face to scare off humans. He can also transform into a cute faced kitten, and often does so in order to get food. He comes to the living world appearing as a demon cat, who scares Rinne and Sakura's classmates. He claims to have been sent by Tamako to form a contract with Rinne, to which the boy refuses, having no resources to support the helper. He then appears to Sakura and reveals to her the true reason of Rinne's shinigami duties, while Rinne finds a letter, discovering the truth about him: Tamako fired him and he came looking for Rinne's support. Eventually, the two form a contract, on the grounds that Rokumon covers his own living expenses. He does not seem to favor Tsubasa.

Family

Tamako is Rinne's paternal grandmother, a young looking shinigami. She becomes upset when Rinne or other characters referred to as "grandmother", instead insisting on being called "young lady". Fifty years before, she came to claim the soul of a young man in agony, with whom she quickly fell in love. She made a deal with the death priest who married them, promising to do ten times the usual shinigami chores in exchange for extending his life fifty years. Should she fail, her descendants would take on her burden. Ten years ago, she saved Sakura from a Damashigami who brought her to the otherworld, but accepted to buy her a candy before sending her back to the living world, which caused her to become able to see ghosts. After her husband's time came to go to the Wheel of Reincarnation, she lost her right to live in the living world, and her grandson refused to live with her. She nevertheless would support her grandson. She has a black cat named Kuroboshi.

Sabato Rokudo is Rinne's father and Tamako's only son. While Rinne was living with his grandparents, Sabato would often sneak into his son's room to steal money from the boy's piggybank, and take out large debts in his son's name by using forged stamps or other methods. Sabato is the president of the Damashigami Company, an illegal business committed to stealing the souls of people who have not ended their lifespan. Rinne finds this practice of his father's disgusting, and wants to bring down his father's company. In addition to his habit of playing the spendthrift with other people's money, Sabato also has a great love of women. He has dozens of different women interested in him, yet he holds a special place in his heart for Ageha's sister, who works as his secretary. Sabato uses dirty tricks in attempts to force Rinne to take over the Damashigami Company so that he can one day retire.

Mrs. Mamiya is Sakura's mother, a cheerful woman, known to get carried away when cooking and makes/buys too much food. She always stays at home as a housewife while her husband works at a bank, and she’s unaware of her daughter’s ability to see ghosts. She was a student of Sankai High School like her daughter, and a member of the Broadcasting club with an old friend named Otobe who had a crush on her.

 Otome Rokudō is a high-ranking shinigami who is Rinne's mother. She had been missing for many years because she was accidentally pushed into the Wheel of Reincarnation when she tried to get rid of something, and reincarnated, first into a fish, then a canary, then anteater before becoming an elementary school girl named Ichigo.

Humans

Miho is a classmate and friend of Sakura and Rika, and also the student council secretary. She has great interest in scary stories, though she’s a scaredy cat like Rika.

Rika is Sakura and Miho's superstitious friend. At some occasions, she finds herself mixed up in a haunting through no fault of her own. Her first brush with the occult comes when she inherited a haunted phone number that has been floating around for many years. Her last name is revealed in the anime to be Momoi (桃井).

Tsubasa Jumonji comes from a family of exorcists. Like Sakura, he can also see ghosts, but often brutally attacks them with "sacred ashes" instead of trying to put them to rest, which can serve to turn them into evil spirits. He initially met Sakura when they were in younger and he began to harbor feelings for her after he realized that she can see ghosts as well. Since his transfer into Sakura's high school, he has tried countless times for Sakura to return his affection and is jealous of the time she and Rinne have spent together, and thus begins joining them on their ghost exploits. Since joining them, he has realized that not all ghosts are evil and has been more lenient towards some. He tends to jump to conclusions, especially when something concerns Rinne and Sakura's relationship. It is hinted that he is Christian.

Ayame Sakaki is a seemingly meek girl who works at a local shrine. When she was in middle school, Ayame took interest in Tsubasa when he got transferred, as they are on the same business, and hoped to get to know him. But he moved away because of his fathers’ job, before she was able to, and a powerful vengeful spirit emerged from her, beyond her own control. Upon encountering Tsubasa again, Ayame rekindles her former interest in him, and Tsubasa accepts to date her to calm her vengeful spirit and make it come back to her body. Her spirit would however go on the loose again many times since she still doesn't have full control of it and she and Tsubasa don't meet very often, and she hopes for another date with Tsubasa, but since he still remains fixed on Sakura, he avoids being alone with her, by having Rinne and Sakura along.

 Hitomi Annette Anematsuri is a homeroom assistant schoolteacher in possession of the Peep Ball, a special shinigami tool that can let her peek into peoples' past or future. As it is a valuable lost Shinigami tool, it would be targeted by many, including Sabato, Kain and Masato, but she is not bent on handing it over, and her constant accurate predictions and Rinne's help allows her to always keep it. Annette is descended from a witch of Medieval France, and her French grandmother met a Japanese tourist who would become her grandfather, and they moved to Japan. Her grandmother and mother tend to be absent at home, always going to the hot springs, and upon returning home, her grandmother would hit her granddaughter in the head whenever she does something wrong.

Non-humans

Masato is a wealthy devil that wants to seek revenge against Rinne. He hates him because during his time at Demon Elementary School, he was given a homework assignment to retrieve a soul and bring it to Hell: a rabbit that was soon going to die from loneliness. Just as he was about to take the still living rabbit's soul, Rinne fed the animal, causing its spirit to return, and ruining Masato's assignment. Enraged, the devil attempted to attack the shinigami with a pitchfork, but Rinne smashed him over the head with a large crucifix, thus beginning their long-running rivalry. Masato often resorts to using his vast fortune as an advantage over the impoverished Rinne, but despite his wealth, his astuteness seems to be a bit lacking. He is a poor speller, often miswriting kanji, and his carefully laid traps are childish and easy to see through. Due to these weaknesses, his plans usually backfire on him.

Ageha is a young shinigami of a wealthy and respected family. She meets Rinne while investigating the Damashigami company, and unexpectedly, begins to have feelings for him after spending some time with him, and much to her disappointment, finds out that her sister willingly joined the Damashigami company for she fell in love with Rinne's father. She would keep trying to win Rinne’s affection many times in various ways, and still hunt Damashigamis although her attention for Rinne became her top priority. She is often shown to be jealous of Sakura, because she believes Sakura and Rinne have feelings for each other, though Sakura is initially jealous of her when she believes that Ageha and Rinne are dating. Ageha and Renge also have disputes, back in grade school Ageha's overzealousness and stupidity often caused problems for pragmatic Renge. She hates it when her sister's betrayal is brought up, shown when she first meets Kain who insults her, and she meets Renge again who brings it up. She has a black cat named Oboro.

Bijin is Ageha's older sister and secretary of the Damashigami Company. A year before the series starts, she worked as a shinigami like her younger sister, vowing to bring down the Damashigami Company. Then, she disappears and sends her sister a postcard, saying that she now has a boyfriend, Sabato Rokudo. Even though he is a ladies' man, she seems to be his favorite. After Ageha uncovers her work as a Damashigami, their relationship becomes more strained because Bijin decides to stay at Sabato's side while leaving Ageha feeling hurt and betrayed by her sister.

Kain is a shirushigami, an accountant in the afterlife. His main responsibility is to keep track of the lifespan of humans on Earth. When Kain was a boy, his mother found herself courted by Sabato Rokudo, Rinne's father, who constantly borrowed money from her, thereby leaving her and her son to live on the verge of bankruptcy. Kain's mother naively believes Sabato to be a good man, but her money has provided the financial backing for his illegal business. Kain doesn't want anyone finding out about his family's connection to the crime group. Because no part of his job requires him to take part in field work of any kind, he is forced to work in secrecy, covertly hunting damashigamis in hopes of destroying the Damashigami Company. Because Sabato habitually uses the name-seal, or hanko, of his son to sign loan contracts, Kain is the main creditor of Rinne and develops a grudge against him. At his first appearance, the shirushigami shows little regard for justice when he attempts to seize Rinne's life-flame to cover Sabato's debts. Furthermore, he shows no remorse when an innocent human bystander like Sakura gets caught up in their battle, even though saying he would get punished for an innocent's death. Although he considers Rinne as guilty as his father, he would sometimes cooperate with Rinne for different reasons including arresting Sabato. He always cared for Renge, however, and even stated that he wished for Renge to follow his dream of getting a better life, e.g. going to the Shinigami Elite High School. He doesn't know that she works as a Damashigami and Renge tries her hardest to keep it a secret. He has a black cat named Suzu.

Shoma is a shinigami grade schooler from a wealthy family. At his first appearance, he paired with Rinne who is supposed to serve as a mentor during their training. He even lives with Rinne for the assignment. However due to Rinne's poverty, he looks down on him, complaining all the while and ignoring Rinne's advice. He is a bit of a glory hound and overestimates his abilities, despite being very inexperienced and even behind his classmates in his achievements. Thus, he takes on too big a task and causes more problems for spirits and his mentor than he actually solves. Furthermore, he is shown to be easily bored and cheeky, e.g. painting his black cat. Later, he meets Ichigo and falls in love with her, unaware that she is the reincarnation of Rinne's mother. He has a black cat named Kurosu.

Refuto is the fourth generation master of the Crescent Moon Shop (三日月堂 Mikazukido), which has been in business for 4000 years in scythe sharpening, and the youngest twin of Raito. Because of his inexperience and bad mouth, the shop has fallen on hard times, both he and his twin sister are desperate for customers, and rely on Rinne's help, but their new products mostly end discontinued and their business sometimes end in suspension.

Raito is the business manager of the Crescent Moon Shop, and the eldest twin of Refuto. She lured Rinne to the store and convinced him to let her brother sharp his Scythe in hope of increasing their reputation and keeping their business going. She and Refuto would still try to come up with ways to make their business thrive, and would still make contact with Rinne to either sell him or ask him to try new products. Though she means well, she is shrewd, going as far as tricking and forcing Rinne to do something for their profit; and seizing any profitable opportunity.

Renge Shima is a new transfer student at Rinne's school, but she is also a Damashigami. When she is introduced, she attempts to steal the souls of boys at their school by using a Marilyn Monroe spirit. She captures Sakura and over a cup of tea tells her that she didn't have female friends because of her seductive ways. While walking to the admission exam of the Shinigami Elite High School, she was knocked into the Sanzu river by Sabato while running from a restaurant without paying. Because of that, she missed the entrance exam and as compromise got into the Damashigami High School for Girls, which is why she holds a grudge against her boss. Still, it doesn't stop her from working for him to earn more money due to her poverty. Renge hates Ageha for the problems the airhead had caused her back in grade school and isn't above using whatever she can to get revenge on her. She also has a considerable, but one-sided crush on Kain that dates back to her middle school years. On his graduation day, she tried to give him a love letter that wished him good luck at the Life Count Administration Bureau. However, she was unable to because of a swarm of girls who also wanted to give him gifts. Renge fears of what would happen if Kain knew she is a Damashigami and does her best to keep it a secret, even going so far as to hit Kain on the back of his head to keep him from hearing Sabato casually greet her as an accomplice or working with Rinne to keep her secret. However, Kain heard a rumor that because of Renge had missed her entrance exam and she was unable to make it up but he chose not to believe it. Even so, Kain seems content to keep things as they are between them. She causes problems for Rinne and his friends but mainly for Rinne who is now her next-door neighbor in the abandoned club house. She has an elderly black cat named Tama.

Matsugo is a former elementary school classmate of Rinne's from a wealthy family. Now, he attends Shinigami Elite High School (the school that Kain and Renge longed to). When Rinne and him met again at the elementary school reunion, he resented Rinne strongly because he believed Rinne almost drowned him in a river on a field trip. When it turns out Rinne only saved him from humiliation, Matsugo's attitude makes a U-turn, declaring that he loves Rinne. Furthermore, he denies he is "that way" but Tsubasa and Sakura do not quite believe him. Like Ageha, he goes to great lengths to spend time with his friend, much to Rinne's annoyance, even using similar methods like the female shinigami, and due to their similar crush on Rinne, the two don't get along very well. His black cat is called Kuromitsu.

Anju is Matsugo's classmate and attends the Shinigami Elite High School. She has a big crush on Matsugo but is way too shy to talk to him, and sadly for her, Matsugo is indifferent to her. She does not have a black cat.

Black cats

Oboro is Ageha's black cat by contract. Oboro's family had served Ageha's family for many years and he is continuing that tradition, much to his own chagrin. During their first mission together the two started to argue and Ageha buried him under a boulder where he remained trapped for a year before being able to dig his way out. Even though Ageha and Oboro grew-up together, neither of them can stand each other. Ageha treated him poorly as a child which sparked his long standing grudge against her. Oboro mistakenly thought he could take revenge against his employer, but Ageha still retains her signed contract that ensures he cannot stop serving as her retainer. Ageha does not like Oboro any more than he likes her, but she chooses to keep him out of spite. In the course of the story, they start to get along better, while never ceasing in their fights.

Suzu is Kain's black cat. One day while in town, Kain came across her, holding a sign that she was up for adoption for a free price. Due to his family's financial status, Kain took her in. Suzu is very loyal to her master despite having a surly attitude towards others. She looks down on Rinne and Rokumon for being poor, despite hers and Kain's own impoverished state. Still, she is hinted to develop a friendship of sorts with Oboro and Rokumon. Her personality is fairly easy-going though somewhat excitable due to her young age. Additionally, she is never full as she is shown to eat a lot on various occasions. Suzu is doted on by Kain's mother.

Kurosu is Shouma's black cat who works strictly from nine to five. He stated he couldn't stand working any longer than that because he doesn't like children. While on the job, he is patient with his master and even does most of the work for him. He is of a high rank, capable of using illusory cat magic. He thinks of Rokumon as a promising black cat, e.g. complimenting him on Rokumon's test.

Tama is Renge's black cat.

Kuromitsu is Matsugo's black cat. She is very loyal to her master, supporting him in his numerous attempts to be alone with Rinne and "deepen their friendship".

Kuroboshi is Tamako's black cat. After being stuck in her master's closet for a time when she had to move back to the otherworld after her husband's time came, he wishes to retire and have his grandson take his place.

Kuroboshi III is Kuroboshi's grandson, who hopes to follow his grandfather's footsteps as Tamako's black cat. However, he has a great fear for ghosts and so can't form a contract until he overcomes his phobia.

Media

Manga

Written and illustrated by Rumiko Takahashi, Rin-ne was serialized in Shogakukan's Weekly Shōnen Sunday manga magazine from April 22, 2009, to December 13, 2017. Shogakukan released 40 tankōbon volumes in Japan from October 16, 2009 to January 18, 2018.

In North America, the manga has been licensed by Viz Media, and published the chapters simultaneously online in English as they were serialized in Japan until March 17, 2011. Rin-ne was the first title to be released under Viz Media's Shonen Sunday imprint, with the first volume published on October 20, 2009 and the last on July 13, 2021. Madman Entertainment published the first volume in Australia on October 10, 2010.

Anime

The 25-episode anime television series adaptation, produced by Brain's Base and directed by Seiki Sugawara, premiered in Japan on April 4, 2015. The screenplay is written by Michiko Yokote and the music composed by Akimitsu Honma. Prior to the anime, an animated commercial promoting the manga and Weekly Shōnen Sunday was created in 2009. The second season premiered on April 9, 2016. The anime's three seasons are licensed by Sentai Filmworks for digital and home video release in North America.

Reception
As of August 2014, Rin-ne had 3 million tankōbon volumes in print. During the week of October 12–18, 2009, the first two volumes ranked at No. 15 and 16 for the best-selling manga in Japan; combined, the volumes sold about 100,000 copies that week. The following week of October 19–25, 2009, the first volume ranked at No. 18 with over 44,000 copies sold, while the second volume ranked at No. 20 with over 41,000 copies sold in Japan. The third manga volume ranked at No. 11 for the best-selling manga in Japan for the week of March 15–21, 2010, and the English version ranked at No. 8 on The New York Times Manga Best Seller list in May 2010. The fourth manga volume ranked twice at No. 19 and 20 in June 2010 with over 76,000 copies sold in Japan. The fifth manga volume also ranked twice at No. 21 and 23 in September 2010 with over 71,000 copies sold in Japan. The sixth manga volume ranked at No. 29 for the best-selling manga in Japan for the week of December 13–19, 2010. A 2019 NHK poll of 210,061 people who saw Rin-ne named it Takahashi's sixth best animated work.

References

External links
 Anime official website 
 Rin-ne at Shonen Sunday (Viz Media)
 

Rin-ne
2009 manga
Romantic comedy anime and manga
Sentai Filmworks
Shinigami in anime and manga
Slice of life anime and manga
Shogakukan manga
Shōnen manga
Supernatural anime and manga
Viz Media manga
Works by Rumiko Takahashi
NHK original programming